The following is a list of operators of the Comac ARJ21.

Airline operators
There are 84 Comac ARJ21 aircraft in active service . Currently, the largest operator is Chengdu Airlines with 28 aircraft.

References

ARJ21
Comac aircraft